Gloucester Downtown Historic District is a national historic district located at Gloucester Courthouse, Gloucester County, Virginia.  The district encompasses 57 contributing buildings and 5 contributing sites.  It includes the central business district and limited residential development directly connected to the historic court circle (the Gloucester County Courthouse Square Historic District) and Main Street extending east to Edge Hill, to include the Gloucester Women's Club.

It was added to the National Register of Historic Places in 2010.

References

External links

Gloucester County Courthouse, U.S. Route 17, Gloucester, Gloucester County, VA: 1 photo at Historic American Buildings Survey
Botetourt Inn & Barn (Ruins), Main Street, Gloucester, Gloucester County, VA: 5 photos at Historic American Buildings Survey

Historic districts on the National Register of Historic Places in Virginia
Buildings and structures in Gloucester County, Virginia
National Register of Historic Places in Gloucester County, Virginia